The 1977 California Golden Bears football team was an American football team that represented the University of California, Berkeley during the 1977 NCAA Division I football season.	Under head coach Mike White, the team compiled an overall record of 8–3 and 4–3 in conference. This was coach Whites's last season.

Cal claims a loss to UCLA as a victory, due to UCLA's subsequent forfeiture of 1977 games involving ineligible players.

Schedule

Roster

References

External links
Game program: California at Washington State – October 8, 1977

California
California Golden Bears football seasons
California Golden Bears football